Valentín Sabate (1 December 1921 – 4 October 1986) was a Spanish water polo player. He competed in the men's tournament at the 1948 Summer Olympics.

References

1921 births
1986 deaths
Spanish male water polo players
Olympic water polo players of Spain
Water polo players at the 1948 Summer Olympics
Water polo players from Barcelona